Iowa Hawkeyes
 
 
 

 Oklahoma State Cowboys
 
 

Steve Mocco (born December 28, 1981) is an American former amateur wrestler, judoka and mixed martial artist. As a collegiate wrestler, he was a two-time NCAA national champion, four-time finalist, and was awarded the Dan Hodge Trophy. In freestyle, he represented the US at the Olympics and was a three-time Pan American Champion. As an MMA fighter, he most notably competed at the WSOF. He is currently a coach at both combat sports, being one of the main coaches at MMA powerhouse American Top Team and an assistant wrestling coach at Lehigh University.

Wrestling

High school 
As a high schooler, Mocco was one of the most dominant heavyweights in recent history. In folkstyle, he won four NJSIAA titles and four national titles, two at wrestling powerhouse Blair Academy. In freestyle, he was a three-time Junior and one-time Cadet national champion. He also won a Junior national title in judo.

He received multiple awards, including 2001 ASICS Tiger High School Wrestler of the Year, the 2001 Junior Dan Hodge Trophy winner, NHSCA National High School Wrestler of the Year, and Dave Schultz High School Excellence Award. He was one of the most sought-after recruits in history and committed to wrestle at Iowa for coach Jim Zalesky.

College

Iowa 
Mocco arrived to University of Iowa as a true freshman in the 2001–2002 season. In his first year of competition, he earned runner-up honors at the 2002 NCAA's and Big Ten's and in his sophomore year he became the undefeated champion at the 2003 NCAA's and Big Ten's.

Oklahoma State 
The next season (2003-2004), he took an Olympic redshirt to focus on training for the 2004 Summer Olympics (see section below).

After the Olympic redshirt and successful seasons at Iowa, he decided to transfer to their bitter rivals, Oklahoma State University.

In his first season competing as a Cowboy, he won the Big 12 Conference championship, the NCAA championship, and the Dan Hodge Trophy as the best collegiate wrestler in the country.

In his last season (2005-2006), he again won the Big 12 Conference championship but lost in the finals of the NCAA championships. He graduated with a 137–6 record.

In August 2006, with one year of college eligibility left, Mocco joined the Oklahoma State football team. As a senior defensive lineman, he played in five games for the Cowboys and was credited with two total tackles, one solo, according to the university's athletic web site.

In 2019, Mocco was inducted into the National Wrestling Hall of Fame.

Freestyle 
Mocco is also an accomplished freestyle wrestler, he medaled at the US Senior Nationals from 2004 to 2009, competed at numerous US Team Trials, and won three Pan American Championships (2006, 2009, 2011). He is also a three-time Dave Schultz Memorial champion and four-time finalist.

In 2008, Mocco competed at the Summer Olympics, where he advanced to the quarterfinals and eventually placed seventh.

In 2009, he won championships at major world-wide tournaments, the Ivan Yarygin Memorial Golden Grand Prix and the Alexander Medved Invitational. He later won another gold medal at the Pan American Championships.

In 2011, he won another Pan American title and his third and final Dave Schultz Memorial championship.

After being unable to find further international success, he retired from the sport.

Mixed martial arts

Steve Mocco was brought into American Top Team to help Antônio Silva prepare for his fight with Cain Velasquez at UFC 146. He had a nice experience in training and was welcomed by American Top Team. After being unable to get past the national wrestling trials to enter the 2012 Olympics in London, Steve Mocco stayed at American Top Team and transitioned into mixed martial arts.

World Series of Fighting (PFL)
On January 17, 2014, it was announced that Mocco had signed a four-fight contract with World Series of Fighting.

Mocco faced Smealinho Rama at WSOF Canada 1 on February 21, 2014. He lost by unanimous decision. Mocco returned to the promotion following his first loss to face Juliano Coutinho on April 10, 2015 at WSOF 20. He won the fight via TKO in the first round.

Even though he never formally retired, Mocco has not competed since.

Coaching

MMA 
Mocco is the wrestling coach at the training center of multiple high-level fighters, American Top Team. There, he trains MMA fighters such as Junior dos Santos.

Wrestling 
Mocco is the head coach and founder of the Mocco Wrestling Academy, where he teaches youth and collegiate wrestlers at the American Top Team facility. He is also an assistant coach of the wrestling team at Lehigh University.

Championships and accomplishments

Freestyle wrestling 
 United World Wrestling
 2011 Pan American Championship Gold Medalist
2011 Dave Schultz Memorial International Gold Medalist
2009 Pan American Championship Gold Medalist
2009 Ivan Yarygin Golden Grand Prix Gold Medalist
2009 Alexander Medved International Gold Medalist
2008 Dave Schultz Memorial International Gold Medalist
2007 Dave Schultz Memorial International Silver Medalist
2006 Pan American Championship Gold Medalist
2004 Dave Schultz Memorial International Gold Medalist
2003 FILA Absolute Championship Silver Medalist
2003 Sunkist Kids International Open Gold Medalist

 USA Wrestling
 2012 US Olympic Team Trials Bronze Medalist
2011 US World Team Trials Silver Medalist 
2009 US World Team Trials Silver Medalist
 2009 US National Championships Gold Medalist
2008 US Olympic Team Trials Gold Medalist
2008 US National Championships Silver Medalist
2007 US World Team Trials Silver Medalist
2007 US National Championships Bronze Medalist
2006 US National Championships Silver Medalist
2005 US National Championships Silver Medalist
2004 US National Championships Silver Medalist

Folkstyle wrestling 
 National Collegiate Athletic Association
NCAA Division I All-American out of University of Iowa (2002, 2003)
NCAA Division I All-American out of Oklahoma State University (2005, 2006)
NCAA Division I 285 lb National Runner-up out of University of Iowa (2002)
NCAA Division I 285 lb National Championship out of University of Iowa (2003)
NCAA Division I 285 lb National Championship out of Oklahoma State University (2005)
NCAA Division I 285 lb National Runner-up out of Oklahoma State University (2006)
 Big Ten Conference
 Big Ten 285 lb National Runner-up out of University of Iowa (2002)
 Big Ten 285 lb National Championship out of University of Iowa (2003)
 Big 12 Conference
 Big 12 285 lb National Championship out of Oklahoma State University (2005)
 Big 12 285 lb National Championship out of Oklahoma State University (2006)

Mixed martial arts record

|-
| Win
| align=center|5–1
| Juilano Coutinho
| TKO (punches)
| WSOF 20
| 
| align=center| 1
| align=center| 4:02
| Mashantucket, Connecticut, United States
| 
|-
|Loss
|align=center|4-1
|Smealinho Rama
|Decision (unanimous)
|WSOF Canada 1
|
|align=center|3
|align=center|5:00
|Edmonton, Alberta, Canada
|
|-
|Win
|align=center|4-0
|Alonzo Roane 
|Submission (arm-triangle choke)
|Fight Time 17 - Undisputed
|
|align=center|3
|align=center|0:47
|Fort Lauderdale, Florida, United States
|
|-
|Win
|align=center|3-0
|Lew Polley
|Decision (unanimous)
|RFA 9 - Munhoz vs. Curran
|
|align=center|3
|align=center|5:00
|Los Angeles, California, United States
|
|-
| Win
|align=center| 2-0
|Rashad Brooks
|Submission (north-south choke)
|Extreme Challenge 
|
|align=center| 1
|align=center| 1:03
|Bettendorf, Iowa, United States
|
|-
| Win
|align=center| 1–0
|Tyler Perry
|Submission (kimura)
|RFA 4 - Griffin vs Escudero
|
|align=center| 2
|align=center| 1:34
|Las Vegas, Nevada, United States
|

References

Wrestlers at the 2008 Summer Olympics
Olympic wrestlers of the United States
American male sport wrestlers
American male judoka
Blair Academy alumni
People from North Bergen, New Jersey
Sportspeople from Hudson County, New Jersey
American male mixed martial artists
Mixed martial artists from New Jersey
Heavyweight mixed martial artists
Mixed martial artists utilizing collegiate wrestling
Mixed martial artists utilizing freestyle wrestling
Mixed martial artists utilizing judo
1981 births
Living people
Iowa Hawkeyes wrestlers
Oklahoma State Cowboys wrestlers
People from Coconut Creek, Florida